Jean-Marie Laclavetine (born February 17, 1954 in Bordeaux) is a French editor, writer and translator of Italian literature into French.

Biography 
Jean-Marie Laclavetine was born in 1954 in Bordeaux. At the age of twenty-six he published his first novel, Les Emmurés, for which he received the literary award Prix Fénéon in 1981. Since 1989 he has been a member of the Éditions Gallimard publishing house Comité de Lecture. He translated the Italian authors Alberto Savinio, Giuseppe Antonio Borgese, Leonardo Sciascia, Vitaliano Brancati and Alberto Moravia into French. Laclavetine lives in Tours, France.

Works 
 Les emmurés, Gallimard, 1981 (Prix Fénéon)
 La Maison des absences, Gallimard, 1984
 Donnafugata, Gallimard, 1987 (Prix Valery Larbaud)
 Conciliabule avec la reine, Gallimard, 1989
 En douceur, Gallimard, 1991 (Prix François Mauriac)
 Rabelais, essay, Éditions Christian Pirot, 1992 and 2000
 Gens d'à côté, Éditions Christian Pirot, 1992 (Award for the Best Book of Région Centre)
 Richard Texier, mon cousin de Lascaux, Éditions du Cygne, 1993
 Le Rouge et le Blanc, Gallimard, 1994
 Demain la veille, Gallimard, 1997
 Port-Paradis with Philippe Chauvet, Gallimard, 1997
 Richard Texier - Les Dieux de la nuit, Le Temps qu'il fait, 1998
 Écriverons et liserons, dialogue en vingt lettres with Jean Lahougue, Champ Vallon, 1998
 Première ligne, Gallimard, 1999 (Prix Goncourt des lycéens)
 Brenne secrète, Maison du Parc régional de la Brenne, 2000
 Le pouvoir des fleurs, Gallimard, 2002
 La Loire, Mille kilomètres de bonheur, National Geographic, 2002
 Trains de vie, Gallimard, 2003
 Matins bleus, Gallimard, 2004
 Petite éloge du présent, Folio, 2007
 Nous voilà, Gallimard, 2009 (Prix du Roman historique des Rendez-vous de l'histoire de Blois) 
 La martre et le léopard: carnets d'un voyage en Croatie, Gallimard, 2010

References

External links 
 Biography and links
 Film excerpt by Doc Pilo

Writers from Bordeaux
1953 births
Living people
20th-century French non-fiction writers
21st-century French non-fiction writers
Italian–French translators
Prix Fénéon winners
Prix Valery Larbaud winners
Prix Goncourt des lycéens winners
20th-century French male writers